"L.I.F.E.G.O.E.S.O.N." is a song by English folk band Noah and the Whale. The single served as the lead single from the band's third studio album, Last Night on Earth. The single was released in the United Kingdom as a digital download on 21 January 2011, peaking at number 14 on the UK Singles Chart and number 26 on the Irish Singles Chart.

The song has been noted for similarities to Tom Petty and the Heartbreakers' "Don't Come Around Here No More" and The Kinks' "Lola".

Chart performance
"L.I.F.E.G.O.E.S.O.N." debuted on the UK Singles Chart on 30 January 2011 at number 37. The following week, the single rose 7 places to number 30; before spending four consecutive weeks between the number 30 and 40 positions. On 13 March, the single climbed 12 places from number 31 to number 19; falling a single place to number 20 the week after. Following a performance on Dancing on Ice, the single rose 6 places to a current peak of number 14; marking the band's second highest charting single since 5 Years Time. In 2011, "L.I.F.E.G.O.E.S.O.N." sold 242,000 copies in the UK. The song made its debut on the Irish Singles Chart on 3 February 2011 at number 48, climbing 12 places to number 35 the following week; where it spent two consecutive weeks then reached number twenty-six. The song was the 5th highest selling rock single of 2011 in the UK.

Music video
The music video for the song appeared on their YouTube channel on 7 January 2011 and stars both the band and British actor Dan Westwick.

Track listing

Credits and personnel
Lead vocals, guitar  – Charlie Fink
Violin  – Tom Hobden
Bass guitar  – Matt Owens
Guitar  – Fred Abbott
Drums  – Jack Hamson
Producers – Charlie Fink, Jason Lader
Lyrics –  Charlie Fink
Label: Mercury Records

Charts

Weekly charts

Year-end charts

Certifications

Release history

References

Noah and the Whale songs
2011 singles
Mercury Records singles
Music videos directed by Sophie Muller
Rock ballads